Felipe Ignacio Mena Villar is a Chilean agronomist who was elected as a member of the Chilean Constitutional Convention.

From 2020 to 2021, he served as Regional Director of the «Instituto Nacional de Deportes» (National Institute of Sports).

References

External links
 Chile Constituyente Profile

Living people
Members of the Chilean Constitutional Convention
Independent Democratic Union politicians
21st-century Chilean politicians
Chilean agronomists
Austral University of Chile alumni
Year of birth missing (living people)